Cynaeda is a genus of moths of the family Crambidae.

Species

Cynaeda affinis (Rothschild, 1915)
Cynaeda albidalis (Hampson, 1913)
Cynaeda allardalis (Oberthür, 1876)
Cynaeda alticolalis (Christoph, 1877)
Cynaeda annuliferalis (Hampson, 1913)
Cynaeda dentalis (Denis & Schiffermüller, 1775)
Cynaeda dichroalis (Hampson, 1903)
Cynaeda escherichi (O. Hofmann, 1897)
Cynaeda forsteri Lattin, 1951
Cynaeda furiosa Hampson, 1900
Cynaeda fuscinervis (Hampson, 1896)
Cynaeda gigantea Wocke, 1871
Cynaeda globuliferalis (Hampson in Poulton, 1916)
Cynaeda hilgerti (Rothschild, 1915)
Cynaeda leucopsumis (Hampson, 1919)
Cynaeda mardinalis (Staudinger, 1892)
Cynaeda nepticulalis (O. Hofmann, 1897)
Cynaeda obscura (Warren, 1892)
Cynaeda plebejalis (Christoph, 1882)
Cynaeda puralis (Gaede, 1917)
Cynaeda rebeli (Amsel, 1935)
Cynaeda seriziati (Staudinger, 1892)
Cynaeda similella (Rothschild, 1915)
Cynaeda superba (Freyer, 1844)
Cynaeda togoalis (Karsch, 1900)
Cynaeda yaminalis (Oberthür, 1888)

References

External links

Odontiini
Crambidae genera
Taxa named by Jacob Hübner